The men's 4 × 10 km relay cross-country skiing competition at the 1988 Winter Olympics in Calgary, Canada, took place on Wednesday 24 February at the Canmore Nordic Centre Provincial Park in Canmore, Alberta. The race saw Sweden beat Soviet Union by 12.7 seconds, with Czechoslovakia finishing third.

Results
Sources:

References

External links
Results International Ski Federation (FIS)

Men's cross-country skiing at the 1988 Winter Olympics
Men's 4 × 10 kilometre relay cross-country skiing at the Winter Olympics